Nadine Hentschke (born 27 January 1982, in Rheinberg) is a German athlete who specialises in the 100 metres hurdles.

Hentschke finished seventh at the 2002 and 2005 European Indoor Championships. She also competed at the 2003 World Championships and the 2004 Olympic Games without reaching the finals.

Her personal best is 12.89 seconds, achieved in July 2003 in Bydgoszcz.

References 
 

1982 births
Living people
People from Wesel (district)
Sportspeople from Düsseldorf (region)
German female hurdlers
German national athletics champions
Athletes (track and field) at the 2004 Summer Olympics
Olympic athletes of Germany